(born July 1, 1964 in Tokyo) is a Japanese actor in film, television, and commercials. He is also an actor in the KERA theatre company (also known as Nylon100℃, Keralino Sandorovic).

Stage history
Gekidan Kenkou(劇団健康) 20 appearance from 1986 in total
Nylon100℃(ナイロン100℃) 15 appearance stage.(data until October, 2010.)

Television
24 no hitomi (TBS)
 Kinpachi-sensei (Sannen B-gumi Kinpachi-sensei part 2) (TBS)
Narawareta Gakuen (drama, CX)
Oishii Seikatsu (drama,  CX)
Aiko 16sai  (TBS)
Batten Robomaru (CX)
Detarame Tenshi (CX)
Yonimo kyouna monogatari  (CX)
Akai hanamichi  (NTV)
Triangle Lovers(NTV)
 Kinpachi-sensei (Sannen B-gumi Kinpachi-sensei part 7)guest (TBS)
Shimokita Sundays (ANB)
The Japanese The Japanese Don't Know(NNS)
SPEC(TBS)
Sakura shinju(THK)

Film
Ai no Shinsekai
Nakayugi Hime

Voice artist
Batman(WOWOW)

TV commercials
DODA
0088 Nihon Telecom
JACCS CARD
Otsuka Pharmaceutical Co., Ltd.
Benesse
Glico

Radio
Radio Tosyokan(TBS)

Radio Commercials
Kirin Brewery Co., Ltd
FamilyMart Co., Ltd
Sapporo Breweries
Shiseido Co.,Ltd.

External links
Hideyo Fujita HP Official Website
 Nylon100℃ Official Website
Hideyo Fujita Twitter Official Website

1964 births
Living people
Male actors from Tokyo